The Bourbonnais route is a connection of four canals in France from Saint-Mammès on the Seine to Chalon-sur-Saône on the Saône River:  It includes the Canal du Loing, Canal de Briare, Canal latéral à la Loire, and Canal du Centre.

History
The first section of the route, the Canal de Briare was completed in 1642. It was the first summit level canal using pound locks in Europe. It connected the valleys of the Loire and the Seine. At this time, boats could go from the Loire in Briare, via this canal, to the Loing near Montargis, and then down the Loing to the Seine and continue into Paris.

Though not part of this route today, the Canal d'Orléans was started in 1682 to connect Orléans, on the Loing River, to the northern terminus of the Canal de Briare. This would provide competing routes from the Loire river to the Loing river.

The trip on the Loing from Montargis to the Seine was greatly improved by the creation of the Canal du Loing during 1720–1723. It is largely a lateral canal, using only two portions of the actual river.

In 1792, the Canal du Centre connected the Loire in Digoin to the Saône at Chalon-sur-Saône. 

The use of the river Loire was replaced by the Canal latéral à la Loire during 1827–1838. It connected the Canal de Briare at Briare and the Canal du Centre at Digoin. At this time, the Loire was crossed at level. Later, this crossing would be replaced by the Briare aqueduct.

Specifics

En Route

See also
 List of canals in France

References

Canals in France